Tasie Cyprian Wike is a Nigerian lawyer who, as of 2014, was Chairman of the Rivers State College of Health Science and Technology (RSCHST). His appointment to the office was made by Governor Chibuike Amaechi whose tenure expired on 29 May 2015.

Wike is the current leader of the Rumuepirikom All Progressives Congress. He is also a cousin of the current Governor of Rivers State Ezenwo Nyesom Wike.

See also
List of people from Rivers State

References

Living people
Tasie
Heads of Rivers State government agencies and parastatals
Year of birth missing (living people)